The Morristown Metropolitan Statistical Area, commonly known as the Lakeway Area, as defined by the United States Census Bureau, is an area consisting of three counties - Grainger, Hamblen, and Jefferson - in eastern Tennessee, anchored by the city of Morristown. As of the 2000 census, the MSA had a population of 123,081. A July 1, 2009 estimate placed the population at 137,612).

The MSA is also a component of the Knoxville-Morristown-Sevierville Combined Statistical Area.

Counties
Grainger (Since 2013, Grainger is also part of the Knoxville metropolitan area)
Hamblen
Jefferson

Communities
Baneberry
Bean Station
Blaine
Chestnut Hill (unincorporated)
Dandridge
Jefferson City
Morristown (Principal city)
New Market
Russellville (unincorporated)
Rutledge
Strawberry Plains (unincorporated; partial)
Talbott (unincorporated)
White Pine
Whitesburg (unincorporated)

Demographics
As of the census of 2000, there were 123,081 people, 48,636 households, and 35,364 families residing within the MSA. The racial makeup of the MSA was 93.79% White, 2.84% African American, 0.24% Native American, 0.38% Asian, 0.05% Pacific Islander, 1.86% from other races, and 0.85% from two or more races. Hispanic or Latino of any race were 3.34% of the population.

The median income for a household in the MSA was $31,057, and the median income for a family was $37,007. Males had a median income of $28,304 versus $20,329 for females. The per capita income for the MSA was $16,353.  As of April, 2009, the Morristown metropolitan area had the highest unemployment rate of any metropolitan area in Tennessee, with an unemployment rate of 12.3% (the state unemployment rate was 9.7%).

See also
Tennessee census statistical areas
List of cities and towns in Tennessee

References

 
Geography of Grainger County, Tennessee
Geography of Hamblen County, Tennessee
Geography of Jefferson County, Tennessee